Hildreth Milton "Hilly" Flitcraft (August 21, 1923 – April 2, 2003) was a  Major League Baseball pitcher. Flitcraft played for the Philadelphia Phillies in the 1942 season. In 3 career games, he had a 0–0 record with an 8.10 ERA. He batted and threw left-handed.

Following the 1942 season, Flitcraft voluntarily retired from baseball in order to tend to the family dairy farm during World War II.

Flitcraft was born in Woodstown, New Jersey, and died in Boulder, Colorado.

Hildreth Milton Flitcraft is referenced in Allen Woods' 2017 Formulas of the Moral Law as a seemingly random or stand-in name. The reference is found in footnote 7, and is used within the context of a maxim: “Make a false promise on a Tuesday to a person named Hildreth Milton Flitcraft”.

References

External links

1923 births
2003 deaths
People from Woodstown, New Jersey
Sportspeople from Salem County, New Jersey
Philadelphia Phillies players
Baseball players from New Jersey
Major League Baseball pitchers
Carbondale Pioneers players